Rotsidis Mammari is a Cypriot football club based in Mammari. Founded in 1961, was playing sometimes in Second and sometimes in the Third and Fourth Division.

Honours
 Cypriot Third Division:
 Champions (1): 1997

References

Football clubs in Cyprus
Association football clubs established in 1961
1961 establishments in Cyprus